In 1988, Michael Jackson was honored with Billboards first Spotlight Award for being the first artist in history to have five number one singles on the Billboard Hot 100 from one album. In 2012, Katy Perry was honored with Billboard's second Spotlight Award for being the second and first female artist in history to have five consecutive number one singles on the Billboard Hot 100 from one album.
 Michael Jackson
2012 Billboard Music Awards
 Katy Perry

References

Spotlight